Jean-Marthe-Adrien L'Hermite (Coutances, Manche, 29 September 1766 — Plessis-Picquet, 28 August 1826) was a French sea captain and rear admiral, notable for his involvement in the Glorious First of June and his expedition into the Atlantic in 1805.

Biography

Early career 
L'Hermite was born to the family of a counselor to the Bailiwick and Présidial of Cotentin. He joined the Navy in 1780, at the age of 14 as a novice on the coast guard cutter Pilote-des-Indes, cruising the English Channel, and on which he distinguished himself during the capture of an English privateer off Chausey.

In 1780, he joined the Northumberland as a volunteer and took part in the battles of the American war of Independence. In 1784, when many French naval ships were put in the reserve, L'Hermite left the Navy and worked as first officer on the fishing ships Modeste and Surveillante off Newfoundland.

In 1787, with Castries's reform of the Navy, l'Hermite took a commission as a sub-lieutenant on the Achille, and later of a number of smaller units that escorted merchantmen. One of these was the Goėland, which was escorting the fishing fleet from Granville to Newfoundland.

French Revolution

English Channel and Northern Sea 
In February 1793, when war broke out against England, L'Hermite was first officer on the frigate Résolue, and he engaged in commerce raiding in the Channel and off the Atlantic coast of France. Promoted to lieutenant in August 1793, he received command of the Tamise, recently captured from the British by the frigate division to which Résolue belonged.

After extensive tests, Tamise conducted two patrols in the Channel, capturing over 60 prizes, and was then attached to Montagne, the flagship of the Brest squadron. As such, she took part in the Glorious First of June, in which she ferried orders from the admiral to other ships.

In 1794, l'Hermite took command of a frigate squadron bound to raid commerce off Ireland, with his flag on the frigate . The squadron captured over 80 of small vessels, including on 23 August , a 16-gun sloop returning from Jamaica. L'Hermitte then led the frigates Seine and Galathée and a corvette to Christiansand, visiting several harbours of the coast of Norway to capture English merchantmen that had fled there. Trapped by cold and disrepair, his ships were forced to spend the winter of 1794-1795 there, where sickness weakened their crews. He returned to France with three prizes, though a storm wrecked Galathée off Penmarc'h.

Indian Ocean 
From February 1796, L'Hermite captained the frigate Vertu in a squadron led by Admiral Sercey, bound for île de France. He took part in a number of small actions, and was wounded in the action of 8 September 1796.

In 1798, he took command of the 46-gun frigate Preneuse. He was tasked to ferry ambassadors sent by Tippu Sultan to Île de France to request help against the British. Spotting two Indiamen off Thalassery, L'Hermite decided to attack. He captured them after a one-hour fight, and in spite of a lightning striking Preneuses main mast.  When they arrived at Surabaya, the crew of Preneuse mutinied when L'Hermite decided to send the captured flags to Admiral Sercey. Subsequently, five men were court-martialed, found guilty of mutiny, and executed by firing squad.

L'Hermite then set out for a three-month patrol in the Chinese seas with Preneuse and Brûle-Gueule, under Don Álava. In 1799, upon their return to Mauritius, the ships were blockaded by a British squadron of three ships of the line, a frigate and a brig. The French took refuge in Rivière noire, sent seven guns ashore and kept the British at bay for three weeks, before the British squadron renounced and departed.

On 4 September 1799, Preneuse engaged a British frigate squadron that she had approached in the fog and mistaken for merchant vessels, escaping after a furious fight that cost her 40 men.

In October 1799, off Cape of Good Hope, Preneuse was spotted and chased by the 54-gun HMS Jupiter, which was cruising to intercept her. After a 22-hour chase, L'Hermite engaged Jupiter and managed to manoeuver into a favourable position from which he sent her a raking broadside at pistol range, forcing her to sail back to Cape Town to avoid boarding. His ship damaged and with 80 of his men killed of wounded, L'Hermite returned to Mauritius.

On her return to Mauritius, Preneuse ran into the 74-gun Tremendous, anchored in front of Port-Louis. As she attempted to escape by sailing in shallow waters, the 50-gun HMS Adamant cut her retreat. Erratic winds then grounded Preneuse on a coral bank, and she came under fire from the two ships of the line, able to return fire only from her stern chasers. L'Hermite sent his sick and wounded ashore and was taken prisoner by Commodore Hotham, who boarded Preneuse and burnt her. Ailing, L'Hermite was received with extreme courtesy by Hotham, and release on parole with his staff a few days later. He returned to Île de France a hero, the population celebrating him and a 15-shot saluted being fired in his honour.

Career during the First Empire 
L'Hermite returned to France in October 1801, where he was received by Bonaparte who promoted him to captain, and called him "the Brave". He took command of the 74-gun Impétueux to ferry her from Lorient to Brest, then of the 80-gun Alexandre, and eventually of the 120-gun Vengeur, as flag officer of Admiral Truguet. L'Hermitte's rising star came to a halt, however, when Truguet was dismissed after speaking against the rise of the Empire, and for one year l'Hermite was left without a command. He was appointed Officer of the Legion of Honour at the founding of the Order in late 1805.

In 1805, L'Hermite took command of a squadron tasked with raiding commerce in the Atlantic and in the Caribbean, with his flag on the Régulus; the squadron further comprised two frigates and two fireships. The squadron departed Lorient on 31 October 1805 and cruised off the Azores, Cape Verde, the coast of Africa up to Benin, crossed the Atlantic to Brazil, and sailed towards the Caribbean. On 6 January 1806 they captured . In August 1806, a storm dispersed the squadron and L'Hermite lost his frigates, and he was forced back to Brest by an epidemic of scurvy. in the Iroise Sea, he ran into four British ships of the line blockading Brest, but managed to elude them and reach Brest harbour on 2 September 1806. Having captured around 50 ships and 10 million franc worth of goods during his 11-month campaign, L'Hermite was promoted to rear admiral and made a Baron of the Empire.

In October 1808, L'Hermite was put in command of the Rochefort squadron, raising his flag on Ville de Varsovie. He also served as a rapporteur in the Council of war in the aftermath of the Battle of the Basque Roads.  By mid-February, his failing health had forced him to resign his command and he never again occupied a command at sea.

From 1811, L'Hermite was préfet maritime in Toulon. In 1812, he briefly commanded the Mediterranean squadron, which did not sail at the time.  His chronic illness forced him to rely on captain Christy-Pallière, who supervised the harbour, to relieve him.

After the Bourbon restoration in 1814, L'Hermite commanded the Ville de Marseille. Louis XVIII sent him to pick up the Duke of Orléans and his family in Palermo. This task earned l'Hermite the cross of the Order of Saint Louis.

During the Hundred Days, L'Hermite declared himself in favour of the King, which caused his immediate dismissal.

L'Hermite retired in 1816 with the honorary rank of vice-admiral, and was appointed Knight of the Order of Saint Louis.

Honours 

 Baron of the Empire
 Legion of Honour
 Order of Saint Louis
 Name engraved on the Arc de Triomphe
 The steamer aviso L'Hermitte was named in his honour

Portraits 
Langlois de Sézanne painted two portraits, representing L'Hermite and his wife, which the family gave to the museum of Coutances. A smaller portrait by Fanish, which shows l'Hermite in 1793, is also on display there.

See also 
 Pierre Lhermite

Notes and references

Notes

References

Bibliography 
 
 
 
 
 
 
 
 
Van Hille, Jean-Marc (2011) Dictionnaire des marins francs-maçons, Gens de mer et professions connexes aux XVIIIe, XIXe et XXe siècles: Travaux de la loge maritime de recherche La Pérouse - Kronos N° 56. (Editions L'Harmattan).

External links 
 Jean-Marthe-Adrien l'Hermite, sailingnavies.com

1766 births
1826 deaths
People from Coutances
French Navy admirals
French naval commanders of the Napoleonic Wars
Recipients of the Legion of Honour
Grand Crosses of the Order of Saint Louis
Names inscribed under the Arc de Triomphe